Ou Chrov ("Deep Ditch") is a district (srok) in the west of Banteay Meanchey province in north-western Cambodia. The border town of Poipet is located within the district. Poipet is the district capital and is located around 48.5 kilometres due west of the provincial capital of Sisophon by road. Ou Chrov district is one of the westernmost districts of Banteay Meanchey. The district borders on Thailand and Poipet contains a popular international border crossing which is home to numerous casinos.

The district can be accessed by road from Sisophon (48 km) and Bangkok (230 km). Ou Chrov district is similar in size to other Banteay Meanchey districts however it has a larger population due to its border crossing and related industry.

National Highway 5 runs east to west across the district and ends in Phnom Penh. Although there is only one official border crossing in the district, numerous smaller roads in the district also run to various locations on the border.

Administration 
The Ou Chrov District governor reports to Oung Ouen, the Governor of Banteay Meanchey. The following table shows the villages of Ou Chrov district by commune.

Demography 
The district is subdivided into 7 communes (khum) and 49 villages (phum).

References

External links
Banteay Meanchey at Royal Government of Cambodia website
Banteay Meanchey at the Ministry of Commerce website

 
Districts of Banteay Meanchey province
Cambodia–Thailand border crossings